U.S. Route 60 (US 60) is a part of the United States Numbered Highway System that runs from Brenda, Arizona, east to Virginia Beach, Virginia. In the state of Missouri, US 60 is a main east–west highway that runs through the southern part of the state, from the Oklahoma border to the Illinois border.

Route description
US 60 enters Missouri from Oklahoma south of Seneca and south of I-44. It is a two-lane highway. It intersects Route 43 at a roundabout south of Seneca. Next, US 60 intersects I-49 exit 24 which is concurrent with US 71 in Neosho. US 60 shares a concurrency with Route 59. Route 86 has a brief concurrency with US 60 and Route 59. US 60 will turn east and leave Route 59 at an interchange before passing through Granby. In Monett, US 60 intersects Route 37. After leaving Monett, US 60 from there to Republic has alternate passing lanes. US 60 bypasses Aurora to the south. Then, it passes through Marionville and enters the Springfield metropolitan area and picks up a concurrency with Route 413 before entering Billings. In Republic, US 60 becomes a four-lane divided highway and remains a four lane for  until it reaches Charleston. US 60 enters Springfield and the concurrency with Route 413 ends. US 60 merges onto the James River Freeway where it has a brief concurrency with US 160 and Route 13. US 60 intersects US 65 known as the "Schoolcraft Freeway" before leaving Springfield and the James River Freeway ends.

Between Springfield and Willow Springs, US 60 passes through various communities that are accessible by exits. US 60 also parallels the BNSF Railway tracks. US 60 intersects Route 125 at a stoplight. It passes through Rogersville and Fordland before leaving Springfield metropolitan area US 60 passes through Seymour. US 60 has a brief concurrency with Route 5 in Mansfield. US 60 passes through Mountain Grove. US 60 passes through Norwood and Cabool.  Then, US 60 picks up a concurrency with US 63 east of Cabool. US 60 passes through Willow Springs where US 63 departs from US 60 at a freeway-to-freeway interchange east of Willow Springs. At this point, US 60 no longer parallel the BNSF railway tracks.

US 60 passes through Mountain View where the divided highway briefly ends. While passing through Mountain View, US 60 has left turn lanes and has a concurrency with Route 17. After leaving Mountain View, US 60 goes back to a divided highway. US 60 passes through Birch Tree where it intersects Route 99. Then it passes through Winona where it has a concurrency with Route 19. US 60 passes through Chicopee, Van Buren and Ellsinore. Next, US 60 has a concurrency with US 67 until it enters Poplar Bluff as it leaves the Ozark Plateau.

In Poplar Bluff, US 60 will separate from US 67 at a cloverleaf interchange. After leaving Poplar Bluff, US 60 intersects Route 51 north of Fisk. Next, US 60 passes through Dexter then intersects Route 114 east of Morehouse. US 60 bypasses Morehouse US 60 then enters Sikeston where it intersects US 61 before intersecting I-55 exit 66 and I-57 exit 1 at a cloverleaf interchange. I-57 begins here and US 60 picks up a concurrency with I-57. In Charleston, US 60 will leave I-57 at exit 12 and has a concurrency with US 62 and Route 77. At this point, US 60 becomes a two-lane highway. US 60 and 62 passes through Wilson City where Route 77 departs from US 60 and US 62. US 60 will leave Missouri crossing Cairo Mississippi River Bridge along with US 62 into Illinois.

History
Before the U.S. Highway system was created, US 60 was Route 16.

On May 17, 1946, William Jefferson Blythe, Jr., the biological father of Bill Clinton, died on US 60 in a car accident after he was tossed out of his vehicle and drowned in a ditch.

There have been several improvements on US 60.

East of US 60 and US 65 interchange in Springfield, there used to be railroad crossings over the BNSF Railway tracks that have been replaced with overpasses over the railroad tracks. That project included redesigning the US 60 and US 65 interchange. It was completed in 2012.

In 2016, US 60 through Rogersville was converted into a freeway. Between Springfield and Rogersville, the junction of Route NN/J was converted into an interchange.

Future
The junction of US 60 and Route 125 west of Rogersville is currently a at-grade intersection with a stoplight. There are plans to convert it into an interchange.

US 60 from Poplar Bluff to Sikeston is planned to be upgraded to I-57. I-57 currently ends at I-55 in Sikeston. I-57 will then continue south following US 67 down to Arkansas.

Major intersections

See also

References

External links

 Missouri
60
Transportation in Newton County, Missouri
Transportation in Barry County, Missouri
Transportation in Lawrence County, Missouri
Transportation in Christian County, Missouri
Transportation in Greene County, Missouri
Transportation in Webster County, Missouri
Transportation in Wright County, Missouri
Transportation in Texas County, Missouri
Transportation in Howell County, Missouri
Transportation in Shannon County, Missouri
Transportation in Carter County, Missouri
Transportation in Butler County, Missouri
Transportation in Stoddard County, Missouri
Transportation in New Madrid County, Missouri
Transportation in Scott County, Missouri
Transportation in Mississippi County, Missouri